Turkmentelecom is a national telecommunications company in Turkmenistan founded on April 7, 1993. The head office is located in the city of Ashgabat. It has branches in all regions of Turkmenistan.

Turkmentelecom covers all the main target markets of Information and communications technology services. The company provides telephony services (including ISDN), data networking, Internet access, and telegraph. Turkmentelecom is the only telecom operator in Turkmenistan, providing all telecommunications services, including Internet, cell phones (through operator Altyn Asyr), and email. Turkmentelecom cooperates and collaborates with more than 40 operators in foreign countries, as well as with other communications companies, such as Siemens, Alcatel-Lucent, Ericsson, Netash, Italtel, TCI, and Schlumberger.

External links
Turkmentelecom - Russian language

Economy of Ashgabat
Telecommunications companies established in 1993
Telecommunications companies of Turkmenistan